A leprechaun trap is a children's craft project used to celebrate Saint Patrick's Day.  The "traps" are set up the night before St. Patrick's Day, and children awaken to discover signs that leprechauns (mythical creatures from Irish legends) have visited the trap. 

Leprechaun traps are typically made by families with children to celebrate Saint Patrick's Day. The traps are typically made out of common, inexpensive household items, such as cardboard boxes, tin cans, or paper. The traps are typically green and gold and decorated with stereotypical leprechaun items: gold coins, rainbows, a top hat and shamrocks.   

A trap is traditionally made by young children and set out the night before St. Patrick's Day. After the children go to sleep, parents add signs of a leprechaun visiting, such as chocolate coins or treasure left in their bottom drawers, and pretend that a leprechaun did it. 

Children are told that they must believe that leprechauns are real to trap one. They are also told that leprechauns love gold and trickery and may steal or hide items unless captured, pleased, or scared away.

Similar traditions 
Leprechaun trapping can be compared to the modern US tradition of leaving cookies out for Santa Claus on Christmas Eve.  Similar to The Elf on the Shelf, the project is coordinated by parents or caregivers.

Notes

Saint Patrick's Day
Leprechaun
Irish folklore